The Supertaça António Livramento, also known as Supertaça Portuguesa de Hóquei em Patins (English: Portuguese Roller Hockey Super Cup), is an annual club roller hockey super cup match organised by the Portuguese Roller Sports Federation. Named after former player and coach António Livramento, it is played between the reigning domestic champions and cup winners.

Winners

Performance by club

References

External links
 Página da Federação de Patinagem de Portugal
 Rink-Hockey.net

Roller hockey competitions in Portugal
Roller hockey in Portugal